A police bus, also known as a police van is a minibus, full-sized bus or coach used by police forces for a variety of reasons.

Depending on the use, police buses might have markings or a livery indicating its ownership by the police, and also have appropriate equipment fitted.  Police buses can be ordinary buses with minor or no modification, have some degree of protection for riot duties, or be fully fitted armoured buses.

Seated buses are used by police forces for transporting large numbers of officers to a needed area, such as for crowd control at sports events and demonstrations, or to facilitate large scale deployments for more serious riot control, such as the UK miners' strike (1984–1985).  These may be hired vehicles, or vehicles retained by the police force for the purpose.

Police buses are also used at some large events as static temporary holding and processing areas, where detained people can be processed, and held until onward transport in another vehicle is possible.  Police buses may also serve as prisoner transport vehicles where the police force has responsibility for this. One example of this type of bus is the MCI D4000ISTV

The police may also use buses converted by a bus manufacturer or other specialist company (from a new or retired school bus-style body), to serve more specific purposes.  This can be as an incident control room or mobile command post, or even as small mobile police stations for public events.  The Toronto Police Service, for instance, has used retired transit buses for their fleet.

Other roles for converted police buses can include being used in public information or awareness campaigns, or as mobile recruitment displays.

Gallery

See also

Police vehicle
Ambulance bus
Prison bus
List of buses

References

External links

Bus
Buses by type